Gregorio Salvador may refer to:

 Gregorio Salvador Caja (born 1927), Spanish linguist
 Gregorio Manuel Salvador (born 1981), Equatoguinean football defender